John P. Smol,  is a Canadian ecologist, limnologist and paleolimnologist who is a Distinguished University Professor in the Department of Biology at Queen's University, Kingston, Ontario, where he also held the Canada Research Chair in Environmental Change for the maximum of three 7-year terms (2001–2021).  He founded and co-directs the Paleoecological Environmental Assessment and Research Lab (PEARL).

Early life
John Smol was born in Montreal, Canada.  Both his parents were originally from Czechoslovakia.  His mother was a war refugee and his father a political defector, who met in the immigrant sections of Montreal. His father was killed by a drunk driver in a car accident when Smol was 8 years old.  He has three siblings, all of whom are in academia/education.

Education
Smol was educated at McGill University (BSc),  Brock University (MSc), and  Queen's University (PhD).

Career and research
Smol works on a diverse range of subjects, most of which focus on using lake sediments to reconstruct past environmental trends. Topics include: lake acidification caused by acid rain, sewage input and fertilizer runoff (eutrophication), studies of nutrient and contaminant transport by birds and other biovectors, and a large program on climatic change.  For about three decades, he has been leading research in the high Arctic, studying the present-day ecology of polar lakes and ponds, and then using paleolimnological approaches to determine how these ecosystems have been changing due to natural and anthropogenic stressors.

The author or editor of 23 books and about 700 journal publications and book chapters, Smol is an international lecturer and media commentator on a variety of topics, but most dealing with environmental issues. From 1987 to 2007, he edited the Journal of Paleolimnology. Since 2004, he has been editor of the journal Environmental Reviews. He is the series editor of the Developments in Paleoenvironmental Research book series. He held the Chair of the International Paleolimnology Association  for two three-year terms ending in August 2018, and until recently was President (2019–2022) of the Academy of Science, Royal Society of Canada.

Honours and awards
Among  over 70 awards and fellowships, he is the recipient of the Gerhard Herzberg Canada Gold Medal for Science and Engineering, given by the Natural Sciences and Engineering Research Council of Canada (NSERC) to honour Canada's top scientist or engineer. Smol was elected a Fellow of the Royal Society (FRS) in 2018. He holds six honorary degrees: LLD, St Francis Xavier University (2003); PhD, University of Helsinki (2007); DSc, University of Waterloo (2012); LLD, Mount Allison University (2016); DSc, Ryerson University (2016); DSc, Western University (University of Western Ontario) (2017). In 2013 he was named an Officer of the Order of Canada.

Selected publications

References

1955 births
Living people
Canadian limnologists
Canadian ecologists
Canadian Fellows of the Royal Society
Fellows of the Royal Society of Canada
Officers of the Order of Canada
People from Montreal
Academic staff of Queen's University at Kingston